David or Dave Hawley may refer to:

 David Hawley – American Navy captain
 David 'Dave' Hawley – rugby league player in the 1960s and 1970s
 Dave Hawley – Sheffield guitarist, father of Richard Hawley
 David Hawley – actor in Ex on the Beach
 Dave Hawley – guitarist in Sons of Mumford, a Mumford & Sons tribute band
 Dave Hawley – actor, known for Les Misérables (2012), Fish Tank (2009) and Shiner (2014).